Matudaea is a genus of plant in family Hamamelidaceae.

Species of Matudaea range from southern Mexico through Central America to Colombia.

The genus name of Matudaea is in honour of Eizi Matuda (1894–1978), who was a Mexican botanist of Japanese origin.

The genus was circumscribed by Cyrus Longworth Lundell in Lloydia vol.3 on page 209 in 1940.

Accepted species

 Matudaea colombiana Lozano Colombia
 Matudaea menzelii Walther
 Matudaea trinervia Lundell southern Mexico to Costa Rica

References

Hamamelidaceae
Saxifragales genera
Taxonomy articles created by Polbot
Neotropical realm flora